Kamalapur is a panchayat town and new taluka in Kalaburagi district in Karnataka.  It is 34 km from Gulbarga.

Demographics
 India census Kamalapur had a population of 11071 with 5667 males and 5404 females .

Education
Schools within Kamalapur include:
The government higher primary school of Kamalapur

Hke society ITI College

References

Villages in Kalaburagi district